Krupia Wólka  is a village in the administrative district of Gmina Prażmów, within Piaseczno County, Masovian Voivodeship, in east-central Poland.

The village has a population of 240.

References

Villages in Piaseczno County